The Belaya Kalitva constituency (No.153) is a Russian legislative constituency in Rostov Oblast. Until 2007 the constituency was based in central Rostov Oblast and stretched from Belaya Kalitva to Zernograd. During 2015 most of old Belaya Kalitva constituency was partitioned between Rostov, Southern and Volgodonsk constituencies, while new Belaya Kalitva constituency was reconfigured to northern Rostov Oblast, absorbing near all of Kamensk-Shakhtinsky constituency.

Members elected

Election results

1995

|-
! colspan=2 style="background-color:#E9E9E9;text-align:left;vertical-align:top;" |Candidate
! style="background-color:#E9E9E9;text-align:left;vertical-align:top;" |Party
! style="background-color:#E9E9E9;text-align:right;" |Votes
! style="background-color:#E9E9E9;text-align:right;" |%
|-
|style="background-color:"|
|align=left|Igor Bratishchev
|align=left|Communist Party
|
|26.67%
|-
|style="background-color:"|
|align=left|Sergey Shapovalov
|align=left|Independent
|
|18.19%
|-
|style="background-color:"|
|align=left|Valentina Cherevatenko
|align=left|Independent
|
|10.56%
|-
|style="background-color:#2998D5"|
|align=left|Viktor Ratiyev
|align=left|Russian All-People's Movement
|
|9.84%
|-
|style="background-color:"|
|align=left|Vladimir Kuznetsov
|align=left|Agrarian Party
|
|7.79%
|-
|style="background-color:"|
|align=left|Sergey Tyukavkin
|align=left|Liberal Democratic Party
|
|5.16%
|-
|style="background-color:#FF4400"|
|align=left|Roman Tsykora
|align=left|Party of Workers' Self-Government
|
|3.81%
|-
|style="background-color:#DA2021"|
|align=left|Aleksandr Ovchinnikov
|align=left|Ivan Rybkin Bloc
|
|3.80%
|-
|style="background-color:"|
|align=left|Vasily Bodlo
|align=left|Independent
|
|1.83%
|-
|style="background-color:#000000"|
|colspan=2 |against all
|
|9.57%
|-
| colspan="5" style="background-color:#E9E9E9;"|
|- style="font-weight:bold"
| colspan="3" style="text-align:left;" | Total
| 
| 100%
|-
| colspan="5" style="background-color:#E9E9E9;"|
|- style="font-weight:bold"
| colspan="4" |Source:
|
|}

1999

|-
! colspan=2 style="background-color:#E9E9E9;text-align:left;vertical-align:top;" |Candidate
! style="background-color:#E9E9E9;text-align:left;vertical-align:top;" |Party
! style="background-color:#E9E9E9;text-align:right;" |Votes
! style="background-color:#E9E9E9;text-align:right;" |%
|-
|style="background-color:"|
|align=left|Vladimir Averchenko
|align=left|Independent
|
|37.90%
|-
|style="background-color:#7C273A"|
|align=left|Igor Bratishchev (incumbent)
|align=left|Movement in Support of the Army
|
|20.79%
|-
|style="background-color:"|
|align=left|Valentina Cherevatenko
|align=left|Independent
|
|13.34%
|-
|style="background-color:"|
|align=left|Vasily Mokrikov
|align=left|Independent
|
|7.30%
|-
|style="background-color:"|
|align=left|Vladimir Shevtsov
|align=left|Liberal Democratic Party
|
|4.11%
|-
|style="background-color:"|
|align=left|Aleksandra Pyatakova
|align=left|Independent
|
|3.41%
|-
|style="background-color:#000000"|
|colspan=2 |against all
|
|11.40%
|-
| colspan="5" style="background-color:#E9E9E9;"|
|- style="font-weight:bold"
| colspan="3" style="text-align:left;" | Total
| 
| 100%
|-
| colspan="5" style="background-color:#E9E9E9;"|
|- style="font-weight:bold"
| colspan="4" |Source:
|
|}

2003

|-
! colspan=2 style="background-color:#E9E9E9;text-align:left;vertical-align:top;" |Candidate
! style="background-color:#E9E9E9;text-align:left;vertical-align:top;" |Party
! style="background-color:#E9E9E9;text-align:right;" |Votes
! style="background-color:#E9E9E9;text-align:right;" |%
|-
|style="background-color:#FFD700"|
|align=left|Vladimir Averchenko (incumbent)
|align=left|People's Party
|
|34.27%
|-
|style="background-color:"|
|align=left|Valentin Shukshunov
|align=left|Independent
|
|27.76%
|-
|style="background-color:"|
|align=left|Yevgeny Volgunin
|align=left|Communist Party
|
|10.08%
|-
|style="background-color:"|
|align=left|Aleksey Averchenko
|align=left|Independent
|
|6.77%
|-
|style="background-color:"|
|align=left|Sergey Pryadilnikov
|align=left|Liberal Democratic Party
|
|3.58%
|-
|style="background-color:"|
|align=left|Yury Kholodov
|align=left|Independent
|
|2.38%
|-
|style="background-color:#164C8C"|
|align=left|Pyotr Moroz
|align=left|United Russian Party Rus'
|
|1.19%
|-
|style="background-color:#000000"|
|colspan=2 |against all
|
|11.65%
|-
| colspan="5" style="background-color:#E9E9E9;"|
|- style="font-weight:bold"
| colspan="3" style="text-align:left;" | Total
| 
| 100%
|-
| colspan="5" style="background-color:#E9E9E9;"|
|- style="font-weight:bold"
| colspan="4" |Source:
|
|}

2004

|-
! colspan=2 style="background-color:#E9E9E9;text-align:left;vertical-align:top;" |Candidate
! style="background-color:#E9E9E9;text-align:left;vertical-align:top;" |Party
! style="background-color:#E9E9E9;text-align:right;" |Votes
! style="background-color:#E9E9E9;text-align:right;" |%
|-
|style="background-color:"|
|align=left|Fyodor Shvalev
|align=left|United Russia
|
|59.35%
|-
|style="background-color:"|
|align=left|Viktor Kolomeytsev
|align=left|Independent
|
|22.11%
|-
|style="background-color:"|
|align=left|Nikolay Kolomiytsev
|align=left|Independent
|
|5.35%
|-
|style="background-color:#000000"|
|colspan=2 |against all
|
|9.75%
|-
| colspan="5" style="background-color:#E9E9E9;"|
|- style="font-weight:bold"
| colspan="3" style="text-align:left;" | Total
| 
| 100%
|-
| colspan="5" style="background-color:#E9E9E9;"|
|- style="font-weight:bold"
| colspan="4" |Source:
|
|}

2016

|-
! colspan=2 style="background-color:#E9E9E9;text-align:left;vertical-align:top;" |Candidate
! style="background-color:#E9E9E9;text-align:leftt;vertical-align:top;" |Party
! style="background-color:#E9E9E9;text-align:right;" |Votes
! style="background-color:#E9E9E9;text-align:right;" |%
|-
| style="background-color:"|
|align=left|Aleksandr Sholokhov
|align=left|United Russia
|
|69.32%
|-
|style="background-color:"|
|align=left|Sergey Shapovalov
|align=left|Communist Party
|
|9.22%
|-
|style="background-color:"|
|align=left|Anatoly Borodachev
|align=left|Liberal Democratic Party
|
|8.44%
|-
| style="background-color: " |
|align=left|Sergey Kosinov
|align=left|A Just Russia
|
|3.12%
|-
|style="background-color:"|
|align=left|Igor Katayev
|align=left|Communists of Russia
|
|3.00%
|-
|style="background-color:"|
|align=left|Vladimir Averchenko
|align=left|Rodina
|
|2.74%
|-
|style="background-color:"|
|align=left|Denis Chebotarev
|align=left|Patriots of Russia
|
|1.31%
|-
|style="background-color:"|
|align=left|Dmitry Korochensky
|align=left|Civic Platform
|
|0.78%
|-
| colspan="5" style="background-color:#E9E9E9;"|
|- style="font-weight:bold"
| colspan="3" style="text-align:left;" | Total
| 
| 100%
|-
| colspan="5" style="background-color:#E9E9E9;"|
|- style="font-weight:bold"
| colspan="4" |Source:
|
|}

2021

|-
! colspan=2 style="background-color:#E9E9E9;text-align:left;vertical-align:top;" |Candidate
! style="background-color:#E9E9E9;text-align:left;vertical-align:top;" |Party
! style="background-color:#E9E9E9;text-align:right;" |Votes
! style="background-color:#E9E9E9;text-align:right;" |%
|-
| style="background-color:"|
|align=left|Nikolay Goncharov
|align=left|United Russia
|
|54.74%
|-
|style="background-color:"|
|align=left|Vitaly Abakumov
|align=left|Communist Party
|
|20.32%
|-
|style="background-color:"|
|align=left|Denis Chebotarev
|align=left|A Just Russia — For Truth
|
|8.30%
|-
|style="background-color: "|
|align=left|Marina Gogu
|align=left|Party of Pensioners
|
|5.80%
|-
|style="background-color:"|
|align=left|Artur Tsapenko
|align=left|Liberal Democratic Party
|
|4.97%
|-
|style="background-color:"|
|align=left|Andrey Klimov
|align=left|New People
|
|3.70%
|-
| colspan="5" style="background-color:#E9E9E9;"|
|- style="font-weight:bold"
| colspan="3" style="text-align:left;" | Total
| 
| 100%
|-
| colspan="5" style="background-color:#E9E9E9;"|
|- style="font-weight:bold"
| colspan="4" |Source:
|
|}

Notes

References

Russian legislative constituencies
Politics of Rostov Oblast